Fantômas is a 1964 French comedy film starring Jean Marais as the arch villain Fantômas opposite Louis de Funès as the earnest but outclassed commissaire Paul Juve. In the film Juve teams up with journalist Fandor, also played by Marais, trying to catch Fantômas but never quite succeeding. It was France's answer, in 1964, to the James Bond phenomenon that swept the world at around the same time. It is the first film of a trilogy, and Fantômas became extremely successful in Europe, the Soviet Union and Japan. It found success even in the United States, where fan websites exist to this day. Mylène Demongeot plays "Hélène Gurn", the girlfriend of "Jérôme Fandor", Fantômas' arch enemy. The general tone of the films is more light-hearted than the original Fantômas novels. Commissaire Juve, as played by Louis de Funès, becomes a comedic character, much unlike his literary counterpart.

Plot 
Fantômas is a man of many disguises. He uses maquillage as a weapon. He can impersonate anyone using an array of masks and can create endless confusion by constantly changing his appearance. In the first episode of the series he is unhappy with Fandor, because of a fictitious interview the journalist wrote about him. He takes his revenge by abducting Fandor and threatening to kill him. He then uses his formidable makeup skills to commit a spectacular crime while disguised like Fandor. When commissaire Juve joins the chase, chameleon-like Fantômas promptly commits a crime wearing a mask looking like Juve. In the end Fandor, Juve and Fandor's girlfriend Hélène are all on the master criminal's trail, all to no avail as the man of a thousand masks finally manages to escape.

Cast

Release 
The film was released in France on 4 November 1964 and in the United States on 5 April 1966.

The Fantômas trilogy

Reception
The film was the fifth most popular movie at the French box office in 1964. It had admissions of 4,492,419.

References

External links 
 
 

1964 films
1960s crime comedy films
1960s comedy thriller films
French crime comedy films
Films directed by André Hunebelle
1960s French-language films
Fantômas films
1964 comedy films
1960s French films

eo:Fantômas#Fantomaso